Utricularia reflexa is a small to medium-sized suspended aquatic carnivorous plant that belongs to the genus Utricularia. U. reflexa is native to Africa and can be found in Benin, Burkina Faso, Burundi, Cameroon, Chad, the Central African Republic, Côte d'Ivoire, the Democratic Republic of the Congo, Gambia, Ghana, Guinea, Kenya, Madagascar, Malawi, Mali, Niger, Nigeria, Senegal, Sierra Leone, Sudan, Tanzania, Togo, Uganda, Zambia, and Zimbabwe.

See also 
 List of Utricularia species

References 

Carnivorous plants of Africa
Flora of Benin
Flora of Burkina Faso
Flora of Burundi
Flora of Cameroon
Flora of Chad
Flora of Ivory Coast
Flora of Ghana
Flora of Guinea
Flora of Kenya
Flora of Madagascar
Flora of Malawi
Flora of Mali
Flora of Niger
Flora of Nigeria
Flora of Senegal
Flora of Sierra Leone
Flora of Sudan
Flora of Tanzania
Flora of the Central African Republic
Flora of the Democratic Republic of the Congo
Flora of the Gambia
Flora of Togo
Flora of Uganda
Flora of Zambia
Flora of Zimbabwe
reflexa
Taxa named by Daniel Oliver